FK Nevėžis is an association football club from the city of Kėdainiai, Lithuania.

Achievements 

Three times Lithuanian champion (1966, 1972, 1973).
Twice runner-up (1968, 1969).
Three times won Bronze medals (1967, 1970, 1979).

Participation in Lithuanian Championships

Current squad

Managers 
  Vitalijus Stankevčius (December 2017 – May 2021)
  Darius Gvildys (since May 2021)

See also
2017 FK Nevėžis season

References

External links
FK NEVĖŽIS - Official site 
Lithuania - List of Cup Finals 
FK Nevėžis Soccerway

 
Nevezis
Sport in Kėdainiai
1945 establishments in Lithuania
Association football clubs established in 1945